The following is a list of Jacksonville Dolphins men's basketball head coaches. There have been 17 head coaches of the Dolphins in their 75-season history.

Jacksonville's current head coach is Jordan Mincy. He was hired as the Dolphins' head coach in March 2021, replacing Tony Jasick, who was fired after the 2020–21 season.

References

Jacksonville

Jacksonville Dolphins basketball, men's, coaches